Jadui Bandhan is a Bollywood film. It was released in 1941. It was directed by Nanubhai Vakil and starred Sarojini, Shiraz and Baburao Pahelwan.

References

External links
 

1941 films
1940s Hindi-language films
Indian fantasy films
1940s fantasy films
Indian black-and-white films
Films directed by Nanubhai Vakil